Julia Stimson Thorne (September 16, 1944 – April 27, 2006) was an American writer. She was the first wife of John Kerry, who was U.S. Senator during their marriage.

Biography
Thorne was born in New York City on September 16, 1944, the daughter of Alice (Barry) and Landon Ketchum Thorne, Jr. Her maternal great-grandfather was journalist David S. Barry. Thorne spent much of her childhood in Rome where her father worked various jobs. She graduated from the Foxcroft School in 1962. She also took some classes at the New York School of Interior Design and at Radcliffe. 

Julia Thorne was a direct eleventh generation descendant of John Bowne, a defiant activist in the struggle for religious freedom. William Thorne Sr., third signatory of the Flushing Remonstrance is also an ancestor. Thorne was also a distant cousin of her husband John Kerry through their common ancestor Elizabeth Fones.

Thorne married John Kerry on May 23, 1970, and wore a dress that was over "two centuries old." She and Kerry had two daughters together, Alexandra Forbes Kerry and Vanessa Bradford Kerry. During their marriage, Julia began showing signs of depression and later wrote that she had at one time contemplated suicide. In the 1980s, she created a nonprofit called the Depression Initiative to educate people about depression. Thorne and Kerry were divorced on July 25, 1988 after a six-year separation. She overcame depression by 1990, and by all accounts the two had an amicable relationship.  She married Richard J. Charlesworth in 1997 and they moved to Bozeman, Montana. She continued to be supportive of Kerry's run for president in 2004.  

Thorne died from cancer on April 27, 2006, in her home in Concord, Massachusetts.

Books 
Her book, You Are Not Alone: Words of Experience and Hope for the Journey Through Depression (1993) (with Larry Rothstein) collects accounts of different people who have faced depression. Ann Landers wrote that "this little book could be a lifesaver and the best $10 you will ever spend." 

A Change of Heart: Words of Experience and Hope for the Journey Through Divorce (1996)

References

External links
 Julia Stimson Thorne's Family Tree
 Another Thorne Family Tree, with navigable links through the generations

1944 births
2006 deaths
American motivational writers
Women motivational writers
Deaths from cancer in Massachusetts
Deaths from bladder cancer
Forbes family
John Kerry
Kerry family
Winthrop family
Writers from Bozeman, Montana
People from Concord, Massachusetts
Writers from New York City
Spouses of Massachusetts politicians
American twins
People from Bay Shore, New York